The 1993 Miami Redskins football team was an American football team that represented Miami University in the Mid-American Conference (MAC) during the 1993 NCAA Division I-A football season. In its fourth season under head coach Randy Walker, the team compiled a 4–7 record (3–6 against MAC opponents), finished in ninth place in the MAC, and were outscored by all opponents by a combined total of 248 to 186.

The team's statistical leaders included Danny Smith with 982 passing yards, Deland McCullough with 612 rushing yards, and Jim Clement with 426 receiving yards.

Schedule

References

Miami
Miami RedHawks football seasons
Miami Redskins football